The 1998 Volleyball America's Cup was the first edition of the annual men's volleyball tournament, played by six countries from North-, Central- and South America. The tournament was held from October 1 to October 11, 1998, in Catamarca, Tucumán, Salta, and Mar del Plata, Argentina.

Squads

Main Round

Venue: Catamarca
Thursday October 1

Friday October 2

Venue: Tucumán
Sunday October 4

Monday October 5

Venue: Salta
Wednesday October 7

Thursday October 8

Final round

Semi-finals
Venue: Mar del Plata
Saturday October 10

Finals
Venue: Mar del Plata
Sunday October 11 — Bronze Medal Match

Sunday October 11 — Gold Medal Match

Final ranking

Awards

References
 Sports123
 Results

Volleyball America's Cup
V
P
Volleyball